Enya (born 1961) is an Irish vocalist, instrumentalist and composer.

Enya may also refer to:
Enya (album), 1987 album by Enya
6433 Enya, an asteroid
Enya language, a language spoken in the Democratic Republic of the Congo
Enya Music Inc., a Houston-based manufacturer of ukuleles and guitars

See also
Anya (disambiguation)
Enye (Ñ), a letter of the Latin alphabet